Siétamo is a municipality located in the province of Huesca, Aragon, Spain, in the comarca of Hoya de Huesca. Birthplace of the Count of Aranda and Cardinal Javierre.
Siétamo (Sietemo in Aragonese) March 4 is a municipality in the province of Huesca (Spain), which belongs to the region Hoya de Huesca. It is located 12 km from Huesca, in the N-240, on a gentle hill near the river Guatizalema.

In March 1099 the king Pedro I of Aragon gave to the monastery of Montearagón the church of "Setimo" (Ubieto Arteta, diplomatic Collection of Pedro I, no. 62 p. 268)
In the year 1845 is joined Castejón of Arbaniés
1970-1980 is joined Arbaniés and Liesa

Municipalities in the Province of Huesca